Bditelny was one of 29 s (officially known as Project 7) built for the Soviet Navy during the late 1930s. Completed in 1939, she was assigned to the Black Sea Fleet. After the German invasion of the Soviet Union began in 1941, the ship provided naval gunfire support during the Siege of Odessa. Frequently under repair due to running aground in 1941, Bditelny was unable to support the defenders of Sevastopol until early 1942 when she began to ferry supplies and troops there while also bombarding German positions outside the besieged city. She was sunk during a German airstrike in July when some of her torpedoes exploded. Her wreck was salvaged for scrap between 1948 and 1952.

Design and description
Having decided to build the large and expensive   destroyer leaders, the Soviet Navy sought Italian assistance in designing smaller and cheaper destroyers.

Their crew numbered 197 officers and sailors in peacetime and 236 in wartime. The designers had been conservative in rating the turbines and many, but not all, of the ships handily exceeded their designed speed during their sea trials. Others fell considerably short of it, although specific figures for most individual ships have not survived.

As built, the Gnevny-class ships mounted four  B-13 guns in two pairs of superfiring single mounts fore and aft of the superstructure. Anti-aircraft defense was provided by a pair of  34-K AA guns in single mounts and a pair of  21-K AA guns as well as two  DK or DShK machine guns. They carried six  torpedo tubes in two rotating triple mounts; each tube was provided with a reload. The ships could also carry a maximum of either 60 or 95 mines and 25 depth charges. The ships were equipped with two K-1 paravanes intended to destroy mines and a pair of depth-charge throwers.

Construction and service 
Built in Nikolayev's Shipyard No. 200 (named after 61 Communards) as yard number 1070, Bditelny was laid down on 23 August 1936, launched on 29 June 1937. The ship was completed on 2 October 1939 and was commissioned into the Black Sea Fleet on 22 October.

When the Germans invaded the Soviet Union on 22 June 1941, Bditelny was assigned to the 2nd Destroyer Division and was refitting in Nikolayev. The refit was completed by 10 July when the ship steamed for Sevastopol, but she had to return for repairs. The same thing happened eight days later. While covering the transfer of incomplete ships from Nikolayev to Sevastopol on 13 August, Bditelny was damaged when she accidentally collided with the freighter . After repairs were completed, the ship provided gunfire support for the defenders of Odessa on 26–27 August. On 24 September, she ran aground, damaging her bow, and repairs were completed the following month. Bditelny helped to evacuate cut-off Soviet troops from pockets along the Black Sea coast to Sevastopol in early November. On 9 November, she ran aground off the Tuzla Spit, damaging her propellers and flooding her middle boiler room. The ship was pulled off and was under repair at Tuapse until mid-February 1942.

On 26 February, Bditelny, together with her sister  and the leader , bombarded German positions at Feodosia, expending 60 rounds from her main guns. The ship conducted further gunfire support missions in the area on 28 February and 3, 11 and 14 March. The following month, she began transporting supplies and troops to and from besieged Sevastopol and providing gunfire support. Between 16 April and 13 June, Bditelny fired 535 shells from her main guns. On 17 April, the ship rescued 143 survivors from the sunken transport  and she was briefly refitted the following month. After the destroyer leader  was crippled by German aircraft on 26 June, Bditelny was one of the ships sent to assist her and towed Tashkent to Novorossiysk for repairs. Her wreck was salvaged in pieces and scrapped in 1948–1952.

Citations

Sources

Further reading
 

Gnevny-class destroyers
1937 ships
Ships built at Shipyard named after 61 Communards
Destroyers sunk by aircraft
Ships sunk by German aircraft